Pacifico may refer to:

People
Pacificus of Verona (776–844), 9th century archdeacon of Verona
Pacificus (Pacifico), 13th-century follower of St. Francis of Assisi
Pacificus of San Severino (1653–1721), 17th-century saint
Pacifico Licutan (d. 1835), Brazilian Muslim slave involved in the Malê revolt

Sports
Club Deportivo Pacífico FC, a Peruvian football club
Pacífico F.C., a defunct Colombian football club

Transport
Pacífico (Madrid Metro), metro stop on Lines 1 and 6 of the Madrid Metro

Brands and businesses
Pacifico Yokohama, a convention center in Japan
Pacífico (beer), a Mexican pilsner beer originally brewed in Mazatlán, Sinaloa

Music
Pacifico (singer), an Italian singer-songwriter, composer and musician

Albums
Pacifico, an album by The Lassie Foundation, 2000
Pacifico, an album by Pacifico (singer), 2002
Pacifico, an album by Donavan with the Muradian Quintet, 2004
Pacifico, an album by Kantuta, 1993, nominated for best producer award at the 1994 New Zealand Music Awards

Songs
"Pacifico", song by Ugly Casanova from Sharpen Your Teeth, 2002
"Pacifico", song by Majid Jordan from Majid Jordan, 2016